The Waking Sleep is the fourth studio album by the American singer-songwriter Katie Herzig. "Lost and Found" appeared on the episode "Your World" in the season 3 finale of the sitcom Cougar Town and on the episode "Take the Lead" in the eighth season of Grey's Anatomy. "Closest I Get" is also featured on Grey's Anatomy.

The album was released in the formats CD, Digital download and also is her first vinyl album.

Track listing

References

2011 albums
Katie Herzig albums